DB Schenker Rail Rybnik S.A., till 2009 PCC RAIL RYBNIK S.A., formerly Przedsiębiorstwo Transportu Kolejowego i Gospodarki Kamieniem w Rybniku, PTKiGK Rybnik (Rail Transport and Stone Management Company in Rybnik), is a Polish rail company operating mainly in freight transport. 
The company owns 110 locomotives and 1577 freight cars. In 2005, it transported over 52,700,000 tons of cargo. Locomotives are painted red and light yellow (the PTKiGK livery), but the colours are to be changed to the blue-orange PCC Rail livery.

History 
PTKiGK Rybnik emerged from the company ZTKiGK, that started operation  in 1965, taking care of mainly stone transport.
In 1994, the company was privatised and went public under the name PTKiGK.
In 2007, the main part of shares was taken over by the PCC Rail group; on 8 October 2008, the name was changed to the PCC Rail Rybnik.

Acquisition by Deutsche Bahn
On 30 January 2009, PCC's president Waldemar Preussner sold PCC Rail S.A. to Deutsche Bahn, the German national railway company. PCC Rail is slated to become a part of DB Schenker Rail's Eastern European operations. After the transaction was finalized, the name of the company was changed to DB Schenker Rail Rybnik S.A.

See also 
 Transportation in Poland
 List of railway companies
 Polish locomotives designation

References

External links 
Companies official website, URL accessed at 16 July 2006

Railway companies of Poland
PCC Rail companies
Deutsche Bahn